Gorenji Vrh pri Dobrniču is a small village in the Municipality of Trebnje in eastern Slovenia. The area is part of the historical region of Lower Carniola. The municipality is now included in the Southeast Slovenia Statistical Region. The nucleated village was built around a small pond in the 18th century and is included on the list of cultural monuments published by the Ministry of Culture of the Republic of Slovenia.

Name
The name of the settlement was changed from Gorenji Vrh to Gorenji Vrh pri Dobrniču in 1953.

References

External links
Gorenji Vrh pri Dobrniču at Geopedia

Populated places in the Municipality of Trebnje